This is a list of all United States Supreme Court cases from volume 477 of the United States Reports:

External links

1986 in United States case law